The siege of Negroponte (modern Chalkis) was undertaken by the forces of the Republic of Venice from July to October 1688. The Venetian army, composed of several mercenary and allied contingents from western Europe, had succeeded in capturing the Peloponnese in the previous years, and proceeded to capture Athens and attack Negroponte, the main Ottoman stronghold in Central Greece. The Venetian siege was hampered by the Ottoman resistance and their inability to completely isolate the town, as the Ottoman general Ismail Pasha managed to ferry supplies to the besieged garrison. Furthermore, the Venetian army suffered many casualties from an outbreak of the plague in the Venetian camp, which led to the death of 4,000 troops and the experienced general Otto Wilhelm Königsmarck. The departure of the Florentine and Maltese contingents further weakened the Venetians, and when the German mercenaries refused to remain there in winter quarters, the Venetian commander, Doge Francesco Morosini, had to concede defeat and retreat to the Peloponnese.

References

Sources 
 
 
 
 

1688 in the Ottoman Empire
17th century in Greece
Negroponte
History of Chalcis
Negroponte
Negroponte 1688
Negroponte 1688